The World Is Rich is a 1947 British documentary film directed by Paul Rotha about food shortages after World War II. It was nominated for an Academy Award for Best Documentary Feature.

References

External links

1947 films
1947 documentary films
British documentary films
Black-and-white documentary films
Films directed by Paul Rotha
British black-and-white films
1940s English-language films
1940s British films